The Ranger Battalion, King's Guard, 3rd Special Forces Regiment, King's Guard (พัน.จจ.รอ.รพศ.3 รอ.) also known as Royal Thai Army Ranger is a Light infantry and Special operations Battalion of the Royal Thai Army. It is a part of the 3rd Special Forces Regiment, King's Guard Royal Thai Army Special Warfare Command. The unit is composed of the Ranger Company and Special Operation Company.

History
Royal Thai Army Ranger Battalion was established by the Royal Thai Army order 121/31 in June 1988 as a unit that looks like a United States Army Rangers.

Modern Ranger selection and training

Qualifications
Be age 18–25.
Be a Thai citizen.

Organization
 Ranger Battalion Headquarters
 1st Ranger Company, King's Guard
 2nd Ranger Company, King's Guard
 3rd Ranger Company, King's Guard

References

Special forces of Thailand
Military units and formations established in 1988